The Osbournes is an American reality television program featuring the domestic life of heavy metal singer Ozzy Osbourne and his family—his wife Sharon, their daughter Kelly, and their son Jack. The series premiered on MTV on March 5, 2002, and, in its first season, was cited as the most-viewed series ever on MTV. The final episode aired on March 21, 2005.

Overview
In addition to heavy metal singer Ozzy Osbourne, the show features his wife and manager Sharon, and their children Jack and Kelly. The Osbournes have another daughter, Aimee, who refused to participate in the show and publicly criticized her parents for their antics on the show. In most family photos shown on the show, she is either absent or blurred. The series also followed the family as they dealt with major events such as Sharon's battle with cancer and the aftermath of an ATV accident that nearly killed Ozzy.

The theme song for the show is a cover of Ozzy's song "Crazy Train" by Lewis Lamedica, done in a jazz-swing style reminiscent of Pat Boone.

Concurrent with the success of the series, Kelly Osbourne launched a brief career as a singer, while Sharon Osbourne hosted The Sharon Osbourne Show. The family also parodied their TV series during cameo appearances at awards shows and in the film Austin Powers in Goldmember.

Jack and Kelly's friend Robert Marcato made regular appearances on the show; Sharon took him in during the second season after his mother died of cancer. While a constant presence in front of the camera, few plots revolved around Robert and he had few lines. After the series ended, it was reported that the Osbournes had sent Robert back to Rhode Island to live with his father after spending a week at a psychiatric ward. The Osbournes were assumed to have adopted Robert, but Sharon Osbourne has denied this.

Another person who makes recurring appearances on the show is Melinda, Sharon's executive assistant and nanny, who is also married to Ozzy's tour manager. She is often seen trying to get Jack out of bed while he berates and belittles her, telling her to "get a real job." Melinda is originally from Australia.

Ozzy confirmed in an interview on BBC Radio 2 in May 2009 that he was "stoned during the entire filming of The Osbournes" and will not watch the episodes for this reason.

Profanity was censored during MTV broadcasts of the series in the United States. In an interview, Ozzy stated that while he was happy that the Canadian broadcasts were uncensored, he preferred the censored version because the cursing was more noticeable due to the bleeps. The Canadian broadcasts on CTV and UK broadcasts on MTV and Channel 4 are uncensored. Some episodes were also aired uncensored to Australian audiences when shown on Network Ten. It is broadcast uncensored on MTV Australia.

Episodes

Staging
Jack and Kelly stated in an interview that some of the situations on the show, including the visit from the dog therapist, were arranged by MTV producers. Ozzy Osbourne's publicist denied that any reaction were staged.

After filming
On November 30 and December 1, 2007, items belonging to the Osbournes and featured in the show were auctioned off to the public. The two-day event listed memorabilia as well as furnishings of the home. Bidders could bid through the Auction Network.

In 2009, the Osbournes reunited for the debut of their new variety show Osbournes Reloaded for the Fox network. Produced by Fremantle Media North America, the series debuted on March 31, 2009, at 9:25PM ET/PT, following American Idol. It consisted of sketches, stunts, celebrity cameos, music performances, and pretaped segments. The show was canceled after airing its first episode. On its debut, 26 Fox affiliates pre-empted or delayed the program due to its racy content, which the stations felt was more appropriate for older viewers.

Since 2016, Ozzy and Jack have starred in Ozzy & Jack's World Detour, a reality-series that initially aired on History before moving to A&E for its second season. On January 23, 2018, Jack revealed on his official Instagram page that the series had been picked up for a third season. The eight-episode third season premiered on A&E on June 13, 2018, with Jack's sister Kelly Osbourne joining the cast.

More recently, The Osbournes Want to Believe was released on August 2, 2020, on Travel Channel.

2022 revival

In October 2015, Kelly Osbourne stated that she was open to the idea of a revival that was new and different, saying that "we did it on MTV and that had never been done before so if we're going to come back, we'd want to do it in a way that has never been done before either."
In 2022, it was announced the show would return to follow the family in the UK.

Home releases
Only seasons one and two (released in two sets as season two and two 1/2 or 2.5) have been released on DVD by Miramax Home Entertainment and Buena Vista Home Entertainment. 

The Osbourne Family Album, a various artists compilation based on the show, was released in June 2002.

Awards and nominations 
As well as achieving the highest ratings in MTV history, The Osbournes won a 2002 Primetime Emmy Award for Outstanding Reality Program.

International airings
The series aired on CTV and MusiquePlus in Canada, Channel 4 in the UK and MTV UK and Ireland in Ireland and the UK, VH1 India in India, RTÉ Two in Ireland, Network Ten and MTV Australia in Australia, TV2 Denmark, MTV Finland and Nelonen in Finland, MTV Latin America in Latin America, MTV Portugal in Portugal, TV2 in New Zealand, MTV Germany in Germany, MTV Ukraine in Ukraine, MTV Brasil in Brazil, MTV Italia in Italy, MTV Nederland in the Netherlands and MTV Europe.

In popular culture
 The Osbournes has a slot game adaptation created by Microgaming.
 The retro looking typeface used for the main title is called Swanky and was designed by Stuart Sandler of Font Diner.

See also 

 Hogan Knows Best (2005)
 Gene Simmons Family Jewels (2006)
 Rock of Love with Bret Michaels (2007)

References

External links 
 

2002 American television series debuts
2005 American television series endings
2000s American reality television series
Television series based on singers and musicians
English-language television shows
MTV reality television series
Ozzy Osbourne
Primetime Emmy Award for Outstanding Reality Program winners
Kelly Osbourne
Osbourne family
Television shows set in Chicago
Television shows set in Los Angeles
Celebrity reality television series